An aviso was originally a kind of dispatch boat or "advice boat", carrying orders before the development of effective remote communication.

The term, derived from the Portuguese and Spanish word for "advice", "notice" or "warning", an aviso, was later adopted by the French and Portuguese navies to classify their medium-sized warships designed for colonial service. The term continued to be used in the French Navy to classify the  patrol frigates until 2012, when the remaining ships of the class were reclassified as offshore patrol ships. It is equivalent to the modern use of "sloop" in other countries.

Description
The Dictionnaire de la Marine Française 1788–1792 (by Nicolas-Charles Romme) describes avisos as "small boats designed to carry orders or dispatches". By the late 19th Century, an aviso could be of several hundred tons displacement. Usually very lightly armed and often not significantly faster than battleships or cruisers, the aviso was not intended to face enemy warships and this meant that paddle-wheel propulsion was still viable for them.

Avisos remained a useful element of communications at sea into the start of the Twentieth Century. The advent of wireless telegraphy changed this, however; avisos became obsolete as dispatch-carrying vessels with the continued development & improvement of this means of immediately communicating detailed information at a distance. As a result, in the early years of the 20th Century, the type was instead optimised for the colonial defence and escort roles

The Portuguese Navy used avisos to operate in the waters of the Portuguese Empire. The Portuguese built the first-rate  class of 1,780 tons and the second-rate ( and Pedro Nunes classes of 950 to 1,090 tons).

In some navies the term is now used to include combat-capable ships larger than patrol boats, but smaller than corvettes. They typically have roles in anti-submarine warfare and coastal defence. For example, the Italian Orsa-class anti-submarine escort destroyers of WW2 were rated for a time as aviso scorta or 'escort aviso'. In NATO classification avisos of ASW type usually are recognized as corvettes.

The Argentine Navy has several ships classified as avisos. , an 800-ton vessel used for non-combat tasks, built as a United States Navy fleet tug, was attacked and damaged during the 1982 Falklands War.

See also
 ,  and  – U.S. Navy gunboats similar to colonial sloops
 s – Dutch colonial sloops officially rated as "Kanonneerboot" (gunboats)
  – improved Flores-class gunboat

References

External links 
 

Avisos